Samuel Adams (23 December 1786 – 8 December 1856) was an Irish Anglican priest in the 19th century.

A graduate of Trinity College, Dublin, he became a Prebendary of Elphin in 1813. He was Dean of Cashel  from 1829  until his death.

References

Deans of Cashel
Alumni of Trinity College Dublin
18th-century Irish Anglican priests
19th-century Irish Anglican priests
1829 deaths
1786 births